The 2017 Metropolitan FA season is the club's third season of existence. The club will play in the Puerto Rico Soccer League, the first tier of the Puerto Rico soccer pyramid.

Transfers

In

Out

Competitions

Bayamon Cup
The 2017 Metropolitan FA team announced the A team will be participating in the Bayamon City Cup.

Matches

Don Bosco Cup
The 2017 Metropolitan FA team announced the B team will be participating in the Don Bosco Cup.

Matches

PRSL 

The 2017 PRSL regular season schedule has not been announced.

Copa Luis Villarejo 

The 2017 Copa Luis Villarejo schedule has not been announced.

References